Thrill Jockey is an American independent record label established by former Atlantic Records A&R representative Bettina Richards and based in Chicago.

History
Richards started the label in 1992 with $35,000 of family and personal capital, while working at a Hoboken, New Jersey, record store, and ran the label from her apartment in New York City.

In 1995, she moved the label to Chicago, where "rent and taxes are considerably cheaper" according to Richards, and the independent label found some larger success.

Thrill Jockey offers full-length streaming of every song on every release in its catalog. "I believe if people can listen to the albums, they tend to buy them," Richards said in a 2006 interview with Chicago Reader.

Artists who have recorded on the label include Double Dagger, Future Islands, Tortoise, The Sea and Cake, Bummer, High Places, Trans Am, Mouse on Mars, ADULT., Bosse-de-Nage, Nobukazu Takemura, Bobby Conn, Tom Verlaine, Freakwater, The Zincs, The National Trust, Eleventh Dream Day, Califone, Chicago Underground Duo, Howe Gelb/Giant Sand, Mary Lattimore, Oval, Town & Country, Archer Prewitt, Sam Prekop, The Lonesome Organist, OOIOO, Pit er Pat, Marisa Anderson,  The Fiery Furnaces, Angela Desveaux, Liturgy, Boredoms, Pontiak, and Golden Void amongst others. Artists on the label have often collaborated with other artists on the label to form spin-off groups.

Fifteenth birthday
In 2007, Thrill Jockey bands old and new recorded songs for a boxed set to celebrate the label's 15th birthday. Bands were asked to choose a song to cover by any other act on their roster. Plum 7" Box Set compilation was released in December 2007 on ten 7-inch vinyl singles.

Some notable tracks include: Directions covering Tortoise guitarist Jeff Parker's "Toy Boat," while Pullman tackles the Chicago Underground Quartet's "3 A.M." Bobby Conn, Califone and Thalia Zedek all cover Freakwater songs, while the Sea & Cake reworks a version of Califone's "Spider's House." Tortoise covers Japanese artist Nobukazu Takemura's "Falls Lake," and ex-Talking Heads frontman David Byrne contributes a cover of the Fiery Furnaces' "Ex-Guru."

See also
List of record labels
Thrill Jockey discography

References

External links

American independent record labels
1992 establishments in New York City
Record labels established in 1992
Alternative rock record labels
Companies based in Chicago